Corrections Victoria is part of the Department of Justice and Community Safety in the Victorian Government, and is responsible for the provision of custodial and community-based services as an important element of the criminal justice system in the state of Victoria, Australia. In March 2018, Dr Emma Cassar was announced as the new Commissioner of Corrections Victoria to commence in June 2018.

The services provided include correctional centre custody of remand and sentenced inmates,  parole, pre-sentence reports and advice to courts and releasing authorities, community service orders and other forms of community-based offender supervision. Offenders in custody and those supervised in the community are assessed for relevant interventions to reduce their risks of re-offending. Corrections Victoria works in partnership with other government and non-government justice and human services agencies in regard to inmates in custody and offenders in the community.

History
The Office of Corrections (OOC) was established in August 1983 as a separate government department responsible for the management of adults corrections reporting to the Minister of Corrections. In October 1992, the Kennett government commenced a major prison reform program involving the private sector financing, designing, building and managing new prisons.  The OOC was abolished and reconstituted as the Correctional Services Division within the new Department of Justice. In 1994, the government privatised prisoner transport, security and escorts to the higher courts. In 1995, the Office of the Correctional Services Commissioner (OCSC) was established within the Department of Justice, and in 1996, the CORE -  the Public Correctional Enterprise was separately established also within the Department of Justice. The OCSC was responsible for monitoring the performance of all correctional services. CORE was responsible for managing the public prisons, Community Correctional Services and the Security and Emergency Services Group (SESG). In August 1996, the first private prison opened the Dame Phyllis Frost Centre followed by the Fulham Correctional Centre and the Port Phillip Prison in 1997. On 1 July 2003, the OCSC and CORE were amalgamated into a single entity Corrections Victoria to oversee corrections.

Prison management in Victoria
Corrections Victoria oversees the management of Victoria's 11 public prisons in the Department's Regions.

Barwon Prison
Beechworth Correctional Centre
Dame Phyllis Frost Centre (for women)
Dhurringile Prison
Hopkins Correctional Centre (Ararat)
Langi Kal Kal Prison
Loddon Prison
Marngoneet Correctional Centre
Melbourne Assessment Prison
Metropolitan Remand Centre
Tarrengower Prison (for women)

The Regions also run the Community Correctional Service on behalf of Corrections Victoria using around 50 different reporting centers.

Private Prisons
Fulham Correctional Centre, managed by GEO
Port Phillip Correctional Centre, managed by G4S
Ravenhall Correctional Centre, managed by GEO

See also

Community service
List of Australian prisons

References

External links
Department of Justice and Community Safety

Prison and correctional agencies
Penal system in Australia